Daniel Grando (born 20 June 1948) is a French former ice hockey right winger.

Career 
Grando played for the hockey clubs Saint-Gervais, who represented France in the 1968 Winter Olympics, and CSG Grenoble.  He retired from playing hockey in 1983. He became a coach for French junior teams in 1981 and coached until 1990.

References

External links
 

1948 births
Living people
Brûleurs de Loups players
Olympic ice hockey players of France
Ice hockey players at the 1968 Winter Olympics
Sportspeople from Haute-Savoie